Thomas Mooney (born 14 December 1973) is a former professional footballer who played for Huddersfield Town and Ballymena United.

References

1973 births
Living people
Sportspeople from Newry
Association footballers from Northern Ireland
Association football midfielders
Ballymena United F.C. players
NIFL Premiership players
Huddersfield Town A.F.C. players
English Football League players